Moorpark High School is a comprehensive public secondary school located in the Mountain Meadows neighborhood of Moorpark, Ventura County, California, and serves students from grades 9 through 12. It is part of the Moorpark Unified School District; and had an enrollment of 1,908 students for the 2018–19 school year. The student/teacher ratio for 2017–18 was 23:1. Moorpark High School is accredited through the Western Association of Schools and Colleges. Moorpark High School takes pupils from two main feeder middle schools: Chaparral Middle School and Mesa Verde Middle School.

History
The school was established in 1919 as Moorpark Memorial Union High School. The campus was originally located at 280 Casey Road (through the end of the 1987–1988 school year before being relocated to its current campus at 4500 Tierra Rejada Road). "Memorial" was included in the school name as a remembrance of servicemen lost during the First World War.

Moorpark High School has been noted for its performance in Academic Decathlon, winning the national championship four times with the latest in 2009.

Notable alumni
 Zach Penprase (born 1985), Israeli-American baseball player for the Israel National Baseball Team
Dennis Pitta, Baltimore Ravens tight end
Greg Estandia, Jacksonville Jaguars/Cleveland Browns tight end
Kelli Berglund, actress
Chad Hansen, New York Jets wide receiver
Sunny Hale (1968–2017), polo player for the Outback Polo Team; and first woman to win the U.S. Open.
Chastin West, Detroit Lions wide receiver
Dillon Price (a.k.a. "Attach"), Call of Duty World Champion 2015
 Drake London, Atlanta Falcons wide receiver

References

External links
Official Web Site

High schools in Ventura County, California
Moorpark, California
Public high schools in California
Buildings and structures in Moorpark, California
1919 establishments in California
Educational institutions established in 1919